Andreas Claes Andersson (born 10 April 1974) is a Swedish former professional footballer who played as a striker. He was the Allsvenskan top scorer with IFK Göteborg when they won the 1996 Allsvenskan, and went on to represent Milan, Newcastle United, and AIK before retiring in 2005. A full international between 1996 and 2003, he scored 8 goals in 43 caps for the Sweden national team, and represented them at the 2002 FIFA World Cup.

Club career

Early career 
Andreas Andersson was signed by the Division 2 club Tidaholms G&IF before the 1994 season from the Division 5 club Hova IF. He scored 6 goals in 9 games for Tidaholm before being signed by the Allsvenskan outfit Degerfors IF during the same year. He spent a season and a half at Degerfors, scoring 16 Allsvenskan goals in 40 games.

IFK Göteborg 
Prior to the 1996 Allsvenskan season, Andersson signed for the reigning Allsvenskan champions IFK Göteborg. During his first season with Göteborg, Andersson finished as the Allsvenskan top scorer with 19 goals as IFK Göteborg won the league. In the 1996–97 UEFA Champions League, Andersson scored against A.C. Milan in a 2–4 group stage loss at San Siro. During the 1997 season, Andersson scored 13 goals in 13 games during the first half of the season, before leaving the club during the summer.

Milan 
Andersson was signed by Milan ahead of the 1997–98 Serie A season. He scored his only Serie A goal for Milan in a 1–0 win against Empoli F.C. on 5 October 1997.

Newcastle United 
Andersson signed for Newcastle United in the English Premier League in January 1998. He played in the 1998 FA Cup Final, which Newcastle lost to Arsenal.

AIK and retirement 
Andersson returned to Sweden in the summer of 1999, as AIK's most expensive signing ever ahead of their 1999–2000 UEFA Champions League campaign. He scored two goals against Arsenal during that Champions League season in a 2–3 group stage loss at Råsunda Stadium in Solna, Sweden. Injury problems caused him to retire on 1 August 2005, with Andersson looking to remain in football as a coach.

International career 
Andersson made his full international debut for the Sweden national team on 25 February 1996 in a friendly game against Australia in Brisbane, in which he scored two goals. He scored his first competitive international goal in a 2–1 win against England in a UEFA Euro 2000 qualifying match, which ultimately helped Sweden qualify for UEFA Euro 2000. However, an injury to his cruciate ligament caused him to miss the tournament.

On 5 September 2001, Andersson scored the decisive goal away against Turkey in a 2–1 victory, which meant that Sweden qualified for the 2002 FIFA World Cup the following summer. Andersson was used as a substitute in the tournament and nearly scored against Argentina, but his shot hit the cross bar. He played in all four games as Sweden was eliminated by Senegal in the second round.

His last ever international appearance came in a UEFA Euro 2004 qualifying game against San Marino on 7 June 2003, before another knee injury ruled Andersson out of playing for Sweden at Euro 2004 and ultimately ended his international career.

In total Andersson won 43 caps for Sweden, scoring 8 goals.

Career statistics

Club

International 

Scores and results list Sweden's goal tally first, score column indicates score after each Andersson goal.

Honours 
IFK Göteborg

 Allsvenskan: 1996

AIK

 Superettan: 2005
Sweden

 King's Cup: 1997

Individual
 Allsvenskan top scorer: 1996
Stor Grabb: 1997

References

External links

1974 births
People from Nacka Municipality
People from Haninge Municipality
Living people
Association football forwards
Swedish footballers
Sweden international footballers
Swedish expatriate footballers
Swedish expatriate sportspeople in Italy
Swedish expatriate sportspeople in England
Expatriate footballers in England
Expatriate footballers in Italy
Degerfors IF players
IFK Göteborg players
AIK Fotboll players
A.C. Milan players
Newcastle United F.C. players
Allsvenskan players
Serie A players
Premier League players
2002 FIFA World Cup players
FA Cup Final players
Sportspeople from Stockholm County